Upernavik Archipelago is a vast coastal archipelago in the Avannaata municipality in northwestern Greenland, off the shores of northeastern Baffin Bay.

History 

The archipelago belongs to the earliest-settled areas of Greenland, the first migrants arriving approximately 2,000 BCE. All southbound migrations of the Inuit passed through the area, leaving behind a trail of archeological sites. The early Saqqaq culture diminished in importance around 1,000 BCE, followed by the migrants of Dorset culture, who spread alongside the coast of Baffin Bay, being in turn displaced by the Thule people in the 13th and 14th centuries. The area has been continuously inhabited since then.

Today the Upernavik Archipelago is sparsely populated, despite the relatively high number of settlements scattered across its entire length. All but one of these settlements are located on the islands. Upernavik town is the largest settlement with 1,129 inhabitants as of 2010, formally founded in 1772 by the Danes during the colonization era.

Geography 
The coastline of Greenland is deeply indented in this region, markedly different from that of the Nuussuaq Basin of Uummannaq Fjord and Nuussuaq Peninsula. In the northern part of the archipelago, the coastal mountains disappear altogether, with the Greenland ice sheet reaching the sea level across nearly the entire length of the perennially frozen Melville Bay.

Islands

Nutaarmiut Island is the largest in the archipelago, followed by Maniitsoq and Qeqertaq. These are some of the islands of the group:

Aappilattoq (Upernavik Icefjord)  Aappilattoq (Tasiusaq Bay)  Akia  Akuliaruseq  Amarortalik  Amitsorsuaq  Anarusuk  Apparsuit  Atilissuaq  Aukarnersuaq  Ateqanngitsorsuaq  Horse Head  Ikerasakassak  Ikermoissuaq  Ikermiut  Illunnguit  Innaarsuit  Inussullissuaq  Iperaq  Itissaalik  Kangaarsuk  Karrat  Kiatassuaq  Kiataussaq  Kingittorsuaq  Kullorsuaq  Maniitsoq  Mattaangassut Mernoq  Naajaat  Nako  Nasaussaq  Nuluuk  Nunaa  Nunatarsuaq  Nutaarmiut  Nutaarmiut (Tasiusaq Bay)  Nuuluk  Paagussat  Paornivik  Puugutaa  Qaarsorsuaq  Qaarsorsuatsiaq  Qallunaat  Qaneq  Qaqaarissorsuaq  Qasse  Qeqertaq  Qeqertarsuaq (Kangerlussuaq Icefjord)  Qeqertarsuaq (Nasaussap Saqqaa)  Qeqertarsuaq (Upernavik Icefjord)  Qullikorsuit  Saarlia  Saattoq  Saattorsuaq  Saattup Akia  Sanningassoq  Saqqarlersuaq  Singarnaq-Annertussoq  Sisuarsuit  Sugar Loaf  Taartoq  Tasiusaq  Timilersua  Tukingassoq  Tussaaq  Tuttorqortooq  Uigorlersuaq  Uilortussoq  Upernavik

Settlements

From north to south, the following are the towns and villages in the archipelago:

Panoramic views

Economy 

Fishing is the mainstay of the area, although the more northern settlements still rely on traditional hunting of fur seals, walruses, and whales to supplement the family economy. In that, the northern region is culturally linked with the far north of Greenland, the Qaanaaq region.

Outside of Upernavik town, the average level of income is amongst the lowest in Greenland. Four of the settlements in the archipelago (Naajaat, Nuussuaq, Kullorsuaq, and Upernavik Kujalleq) are listed in the top 10 poorest within Greenland.

Transport

Air 

Air Greenland operates government contract flights to nearly all villages in the Upernavik archipelago. These mostly cargo flights are not featured in the timetable of the airline, although they can be pre-booked. Departure times for these flights as specified during booking are by definition approximate, with the settlement service optimized on the fly depending on local demand for a given day. Upernavik is the only settlement with an airport.

Sea 
Until 2006, Arctic Umiaq Line had provided ferry services from Upernavik to Nuuk, calling at Uummannaq, Ilulissat, and Aasiaat within the Avannaata and Qeqertalik municipalities. M/S Sarpik Ittuk—which serviced Disko Bay, Uummannaq Fjord and Upernavik—was sold in 2006 to Nova Cruising, a company from the Bahamas. Since then the ferry services of AUL are available only southwards from Ilulissat, operated with the remaining ship, M/S Sarfaq Ittuk.

Cargo/passenger boat Vestlandia of Royal Arctic Line links Upernavik with Uummannaq. Tourism is very undeveloped, but charter boats for individual travellers and small groups are available in all settlements.

References

External links

1:1,000,000 scale Operational Navigation Chart, Sheet B-8
Upernavik Tourism

 
Landforms of Baffin Bay
Archipelagoes of Greenland